Gavgol, also rendered as Gavkol, may refer to:
 Gav Gol
 Gavgol-e Olya
 Gavgol-e Qaleh